Forbidden Passage is a 1941 American short crime film directed by Fred Zinnemann. It was nominated for an Academy Award at the 14th Academy Awards for Best Short Subject (Two-Reel).

Summary
This short film is part of the Crime Does Not Pay series. A father decides to use illegal means to gain entry to the US to rejoin his wife and daughter. The story focuses on the U.S. Immigration Service's attempt to identify the means being used for illegal entry.

Cast
 Addison Richards as Frank J. Maxwell
 Wolfgang Zilzer as Otto Kestler
 Hugh Beaumont as Clements
 George Lessey as American Consul in Lisbon

References

External links
 
 
 

1941 films
1941 crime films
1941 short films
American crime films
American short films
American black-and-white films
Films directed by Fred Zinnemann
1940s English-language films
1940s American films